The Radcliffe Baronetcy, of Milnsbridge House in the County of York, is a title in the Baronetage of the United Kingdom. It was created on 2 November 1813 for Joseph Radcliffe as a reward for his public services.

The Radcliffes were an ancient Lancashire family and took their name from the village of Radcliffe in that county. William Radcliffe married the heiress of the Milnsbridge House estate, Milnsbridge, near Huddersfield and in 1724 bought the Marsden Moor estate. His son, Colonel William Radcliffe, died issueless in 1795 and the estates fell to his nephew, son of his sister Mary, Joseph Pickford, on the condition that he would take the name Radcliffe. Radcliffe took his uncle's name and was created a baronet in 1813.

Following his death in 1819, the Milnsbridge estate was sold and in 1824, Joseph Radcliffe the 2nd Baronet purchased an estate near Harrogate, North Yorkshire and completed the construction of Rudding Park House. The second Baronet served as High Sheriff of Yorkshire in 1857.

Everard Radcliffe, a cricketer who captained Yorkshire, was the 5th Baronet.

Sir Joseph Radcliffe, 1st Baronet (1744 - 1819) 
Joseph Radcliffe was born at Alt Hill, Ashton under Lyne and baptised there on 8 May 1744. He was the son of Joseph Pickford of Ashton and Mary Radcliffe of Milnsbridge. In 1795, Mary's brother, William, died, leaving Joseph his sole heir, providing he was willing to change his name from Pickford to Radcliffe. Joseph took the Radcliffe name at the age of fifty-one and became the owner of extensive estates and properties in Milnsbridge and the Colne Valley.

Magistracy and the Luddite disturbances 
Radcliffe was ambitious, and became a magistrate for the West Riding. He gained a reputation for heavy-handed justice.

In February 1812, Radcliffe began a prolonged campaign to bring the Luddite disturbances to the attention of the government. After an attack on William Cartwright's Mill in Rawfolds and the murder of wool textile manufacturer William Horsfall by Luddites in April 1812, he pursued a vendetta against all concerned. He set up an extensive system of spies and informers to infiltrate workers' meetings, and offered rewards for information that might help convict suspects. Many of those were interrogated by Radcliffe at Milnsbridge House, in what came to be known as the "sweat room". As a result of his campaign, he had three men, George Mellor, Thomas Smith and William Thorpe, sent to York Castle for trial in January 1813, taking a place on the jury himself and condemning them as guilty. The three were hanged a two days later, and Radcliffe was a spectator at their execution at the New Drop at York.

Baronetcy 
In September 1813, Radcliffe was made a Baronet for his public service in bringing the Luddites to justice. On 18 September 1813, Lord Sidmouth wrote to Radcliffe to congratulate him:

I have the honour of communicating to you the gracious intention of H.R.H. the Prince Regent, 'forthwith to confer upon you the dignity of a Baronet of the United Kingdom.

It is with great satisfaction that I convey to you such a testimony of the opinion entertained by H.R. Highness of that loyal, zealous, and intrepid conduct which you have invariably displayed at a period when the West Riding of the County of York presented a disgraceful scene of outrage and plunder; and by which, in the discharge of your duty as a magistrate; you contributed most materially to re-establish in that quarter, tranquility and obedience to the laws, and to restore security to the lives and property of His Majesty's subjects.

Radcliffe continued to live the life of a wealthy country gentleman, often spending time in his house at Clifton in Bristol. He died there in 1819, but was buried in the family tomb in Royton Chapel. Radcliffe's birth surname was commemorated long after in Pickford Street and Pickford Buildings in Royton, and the prize for Royton Athletic Sports day became known as 'The Pickford Plate.'

Family 
Radcliffe married firstly Katherine Percival on 3 March 1763. Their son William Percival Pickford died in infancy and Katherine died shortly after in 1765. William had inherited Royton Hall in Royton Lancashire from his late grandfather Thomas Percival. On William's death, his father inherited the Royton Hall estate. Radcliffe soon remarried Elizabeth Sunderland, who died in 1799. He married his third wife Elizabeth Creswick in 1807 and she long outlived him until 1855.

Radcliffe had 8 children with Elizabeth Sunderland. His son, the Reverend Joseph Pickford, died before him, so his title passed to his grandson, Sir Joseph Radcliffe, 2nd Baronet. After his grandfather's death, the 2nd Baronet sold Milnsbridge House and moved the family to Rudding Park House.

Radcliffe's daughter Frances was acquainted with Anne Lister of Shibden Hall. It is claimed that the 'Pic' and 'Frank' in the encrypted diaries of Anne Lister is Frances Pickford. In recent years, many of the diary entries have been transcribed by author Helena Whitbread. According to the diaries, Frances confessed to liaisons with women and flirted with Lister, who was some 12 years her junior. The two women formed a brief friendship, attending lectures together, shopping, and occasionally walking out. Lister described Frances as 'learned' and 'clever' which, she claimed, was more than could be said for many of her acquaintances.

Milnsbridge House 

The Milnsbridge manor house was built around 1756 for William Radcliffe of Milnsbridge. The mansion consisted of a central three-storey section with five windows on each floor and a pedimented roof featuring a circular window. This was flanked by two-storey wings on either side each with two windows on each floor and a sloping roof.  On the grounds there were ornamental gardens, including two lakes or fishponds and a large front lawn surrounded the property. Inside, the rooms were decorated with rococo plasterwork and would have been finely furnished.

Archives 
The records of the Radcliffe family are held by the Leeds branch of the West Yorkshire Archive Service. The large collection comprises records from the 14th to the 20th century and includes extensive correspondence between Joseph Radcliffe, 1st Bt. and key participants of the campaigns for justice during the Luddite disturbances. Other records in the Radcliffe collection include papers of the Tichborne Trial, naval logs belonging to Admiral Sir John Talbot, papers relating to the Radcliffe estates, the Marsden Manor court rolls, and various family correspondence.

Radcliffe baronets, of Milnsbridge House (1813)
Sir Joseph Radcliffe, 1st Baronet (1744–1819)
Sir Joseph Radcliffe, 2nd Baronet (1799–1872)
Sir Joseph Percival Pickford Radcliffe, 3rd Baronet (1824–1908)
Sir Joseph Edward Radcliffe, 4th Baronet (1858–1949)
Sir Everard Joseph Radcliffe, 5th Baronet (1884–1969)
Sir (Joseph Benedict) Everard Henry Radcliffe, 6th Baronet (1910–1975)
Sir Sebastian Everard Radcliffe, 7th Baronet (born 1972)

References

Kidd, Charles, Williamson, David (editors). Debrett's Peerage and Baronetage (1990 edition). New York: St Martin's Press, 1990.

Baronetcies in the Baronetage of the United Kingdom